Midat Galbayev (born 14 March 1997) is a Kazakh footballer who plays as a centre-back.

Club career
Galbayev made his professional Fortuna Liga debut for Nitra against Spartak Trnava on 4 August 2019. Galbayev, however, had to be replaced by Ondrej Vrábel (footballer) after less than half an hour, due to an injury.

References

External links
 Futbalnet profile 
 
 

1997 births
Living people
People from Almaty
Kazakhstani footballers
Kazakhstan youth international footballers
Association football defenders
FC Zimbru Chișinău players
FC Irtysh Pavlodar players
FC Kyzylzhar players
Kazakhstan Premier League players
FC Vereya players
First Professional Football League (Bulgaria) players
FC Nitra players
Slovak Super Liga players
Expatriate footballers in Moldova
Expatriate footballers in Bulgaria
Expatriate footballers in Slovakia
Kazakhstani expatriate sportspeople in Moldova
Kazakhstani expatriate sportspeople in Bulgaria
Kazakhstani expatriate sportspeople in Slovakia